is a Japanese footballer, currently playing as a centre back for Sanfrecce Hiroshima.

Personal life
He was born in the United States to an African-American father and Japanese mother.

Career statistics

Club
.

Notes

Honours

Club
Sanfrecce Hiroshima
 J.League Cup: 2022

References

External links

1997 births
Living people
Japanese footballers
American soccer players
Japanese people of African-American descent
American people of Japanese descent
American sportspeople of Japanese descent
Association football defenders
Kokushikan University alumni
J1 League players
J2 League players
Mito HollyHock players
Sanfrecce Hiroshima players